An estate liquidation is similar to an estate sale in that the main concern or goal is to liquidate the estate (home, garage, sheds and yard) with an estate sale organization There is no government regulation of the industry. There is also no formal training for estate liquidators. Estate liquidation of assets can be all-encompassing: appraising, donating, cleaning, packing, transporting and auctioning.

In the United States, while it is necessary in most states that a realtor be present to write up the documents for the sale of real land, most other items do not require any other license or permit other than the local licenses needed to run a business in that city, county or state where the liquidation is taking place. Oftentimes the family will retain a lawyer to oversee the process of liquidation and to keep the system straight on legalities of stocks and bonds being traded, investments liquidated and any real property changing hands legally. However, in European countries such as Germany, there are firms which solicitate non-binding initial inspection first and then rolling out the contract. 

Estate liquidations happen mostly like estate sales, with the liquidators making the home and items to be sold ready for a public sale. Most liquidators will charge a commission of a percentage of the net profit.

Differences from estate sales
The main differences between an estate liquidation and a mere estate sale is the sphere of inclusion which in a liquidation can expand to stocks, bonds, real property, fine jewelry, coin collections and fine art. Often an estate liquidation is accompanied by realtors, attorneys, Certified Public Accountants, and appraisers, while an estate sale can be done by anyone with knowledge of value of household items and collectibles in question.

Forms of estate liquidation
Besides estate sales, liquidating the estate may be done in the form of an auction or the estate liquidator will offer a cash buy-out for the entire contents of a home.

Further reading
 Household liquidation alliance

References

Real estate
Sales
Contexts for auctions
Corporate liquidations